Sessions Woods Wildlife Management Area is a  nature preserve owned by the state of Connecticut located in Burlington, Connecticut. Operated by the Connecticut Department of Energy and Environmental Protection, the preserve focuses on conservation education and features the Sessions Woods Conservation Education Center with displays about area wildlife and a large meeting room. The WMA offers educational programs, demonstrations, and workshops about wildlife and natural resource management. Outside there are demonstration sites, self-guided hiking trails, and displays. Hunting is allowed with permits.

The trails connect to the Blue-Blazed Tunxis Trail. The WMA also abuts the Nassahegon State Forest.

The Friends of Session Woods is a volunteer organization that supports the preserve's programs and activities.

References

External links
Sessions Woods Wildlife Management Area Connecticut Department of Energy and Environmental Protection
Friends of Session Woods

Parks in Hartford County, Connecticut
Burlington, Connecticut
Nature centers in Connecticut
Wildlife management areas of Connecticut